Pasand (also Romanized as Pāsand) is a village in Panj Hezareh Rural District, in the Central District of Behshahr County, Mazandaran Province, Iran. At the 2006 census, its population was 1,847, in 420 families.

References 

Populated places in Behshahr County